Martaizé is a commune in the Vienne department in the Nouvelle-Aquitaine region in western France. It is a small village about 7 miles from Loudun.

History

In the early 17th century, Martaizé, along with the nearby village of La Chaussée, was one of the seigneuries of Charles de Menou d'Aulnay. Several of the earliest settlers of Acadia including the Babins, the Gaudets, the LeBlancs, the Bourgs, the Theriots, the Guérins and the Savoies are believed to have been recruited by d'Aulnay from their original home in Martaizé to colonize New France.

Administration

Demographics

See also
Communes of the Vienne department

References

Communes of Vienne
Vienne communes articles needing translation from French Wikipedia